The men's big air competition in freestyle skiing at the 2022 Winter Olympics was held on 7 February (qualification) and 9 February (final), at the Big Air Shougang in Beijing. This will be the inaugural freestyle skiing men's big air competition at the Olympics. Birk Ruud of Norway became the Olympic champion, Colby Stevenson of the United States won silver, and Henrik Harlaut of Sweden bronze. For each of them, this was the first Olympic medal.

At the 2021–22 FIS Freestyle Ski World Cup, only two big air events were held before the Olympics. Both were won by Matěj Švancer, who was followed by Alex Hall in the ranking. Oliwer Magnusson is the 2021 world champion. Andri Ragettli is the 2021 X-Games winner.

Qualification

A total of 30 athletes qualified to compete at the games. For an athlete to compete they must have a minimum of 50.00 FIS points on the FIS Points List on January 17, 2022 and a top 30 finish in a World Cup event or at the FIS Freestyle Ski World Championships 2021 in either big air or slopestyle. A country could enter a maximum of four athletes into the event.

Results

Qualification

Final

References

Men's freestyle skiing at the 2022 Winter Olympics